Ulisses Football Club, commonly known as Ulisses, is a defunct Armenian football club from Yerevan. The club played at the Armenian Premier League, the top division in Armenian football. They regularly used the Vazgen Sargsyan Republican Stadium in Yerevan and occasionally the City Stadium in Abovyan as their home ground.

The club headquarters are located on Nalbandyan street 48/1, Yerevan. Like all other Armenian Premier League clubs, Ulisses FC had a reserve team that played in the Armenian First League.

In 2015–16, the club was owned by the Armenian businessman Genrikh Ghazandzhyan and sponsored by the "Holiday" Group of Companies.

History
2000 – Founded as Dinamo-2000 Yerevan
2004 – Changed name to Dinamo-Zenit Yerevan (name change occurred as a result of a new sponsor)
2006 – Changed name to Ulisses FC (name change again occurred as a result of a new sponsor)
2016 – Dissolved due to both financial and non-financial shortcomings

Dinamo-2000 Yerevan
The club was founded in 2000 as Dinamo-2000 Yerevan, and made their debut at the 2000 Armenian First League season winning a promotion spot to the Premier League at the end of the same season.

Dinamo-Zenit Yerevan
In 2004, the club became known as FC Dinamo-Zenit Yerevan and took 5th place in the Armenian Premier League. In 2004 and 2005, 2 reserves teams of the club were represented in the Armenian First League: FC Dinamo-VZ Yerevan and FC Zenit Charentsavan.

Ulisses FC

In 2006, the club changed their name with the arrival of new sponsor. they occupied the 8th place at the 2006 Armenian Premier League season grabbing the chance to save their place in the top league in a decisive match with FC Dinamo Yerevan. Winning the game, Ulisses FC secured their place in the top tier for the next season. In seasons 2007 and 2008 team play was much better, and there was no need of survival games.

At the beginning of 2008, the club's department was enlarged with the Shengavit football school of Yerevan, while the Vardanank-451 Stadium of Voskehat became the training base of the club.

In 2007, they played their home games in the Kasaghi Marzik Stadium in Ashtarak. In 2009, they moved to the Mika Stadium in Yerevan.

In 2011, Ulisses FC won the Armenian championship for the first time in club history, and ended Pyunik dominance of 10 consecutive championships.

On 3 February 2016, the club declared that it will not participate in the second half of the 2015-16 Armenian Premier League season.

League and cup history

European history

Home results are noted in bold

Honours
 Armenian Premier League:
 Champions (1): 2011
 Runners-up (1): 2014–15

Last squad

Ulisses FC-2 (reserves)
The Ulisses FC reserve squad play as Ulisses FC-2 in the Armenian First League. They play their home games at the Kasakhi Marzik Stadium in the town of Ashtarak.

Manager: Ara Azaryan

Managers 
 Vagharshak Aslanyan (2000–01)
 Albert Sarkisyan (2002)
 Vachagan Khachataryan (2002)
 Alesha Antonyan (2002–03)
 Ashot Kirakosyan (2004–05)
 Sevada Arzumanyan (July 1, 2005 – June 30, 2006)
 Arsen Chilingaryan (2006–07)
 Souren Barseghyan (2007–08)
 Sevada Arzumanyan (2008–Sept 7, 2012)
 Karen Barseghyan (Sept 8, 2012–July 24, 2014)
 Suren Chakhalyan (July 25, 2014–Oct 6, 2014)
 Gagik Simonyan (interim) (Oct 6, 2014–Feb 28, 2015)
 Fyodor Shcherbachenko (Feb 28, 2015–Apr 17, 2015)
 Suren Chakhalyan (April 18, 2015–Sep 1, 2015)
 Gagik Simonyan (interim) (Sep 1, 2015–Feb 3, 2016)

References

External links
 Ulisses FC Official Website
 Ulisses FC at FFA.AM
 Ulisses FC at UEFA.COM
 Ulisses FC at EUFO.DE
 Ulisses FC at Weltfussball.de
 European Football Club Ranking

 
Association football clubs established in 2000
Defunct football clubs in Armenia
Football clubs in Yerevan
2000 establishments in Armenia